The tenth season of Shameless, an American comedy-drama television series based on the British series of the same name by Paul Abbott, was announced on January 31, 2019, two days after the premiere of season 9's ninth episode. The season premiered on November 10, 2019.

It is the first season not to star original cast member Emmy Rossum. Cameron Monaghan, who previously announced his departure from the series in season 9, returned as a series regular. Noel Fisher also rejoined the cast as a series regular alongside William H. Macy, Jeremy Allen White, Ethan Cutkosky, Shanola Hampton, Steve Howey, Emma Kenney, and Christian Isaiah. Kate Miner has been promoted to series regular after her recurring role in season 9.

Plot
The tenth season of Shameless picks up six months after season 9. In order to obtain as many prescription medicines as possible, Frank utilizes his leg injury, and his activities bring him into contact with an old friend. With the help of the $50,000 Fiona left her, Debbie has taken over as the family's new matriarch and is governing the Gallagher household with an iron grip. With Tami showing signs of affection, Lip negotiates their connection. Ian and Mickey have reunited, and this time they are fighting hard to stay together. Carl must decide what to do with his life as he graduates from military school and returns to the South Side. While Kev struggles with identity issues, Liam is dedicated to studying black history and culture under V's guidance.

Cast and characters

Main
 William H. Macy as Frank Gallagher
 Jeremy Allen White as Philip "Lip" Gallagher
 Ethan Cutkosky as Carl Gallagher
 Shanola Hampton as Veronica Fisher
 Steve Howey as Kevin Ball
 Emma Kenney as Deborah "Debbie" Gallagher
 Cameron Monaghan as Ian Gallagher
 Noel Fisher as Mickey Milkovich
 Christian Isaiah as Liam Gallagher
 Kate Miner as Tami Tamietti

Special guest
 Luis Guzmán as Mikey O'Shea
 Vanessa Bell Calloway as Carol Fisher
 Mary Kay Place as Aunt Oopie
 Dennis Cockrum as Terry Milkovich
 Elizabeth Rodriguez as Faye Donahue

Recurring
 Paris Newton as Franny Gallagher 
 Chelsea Rendon as Anne Gonzalez
 Jim Hoffmaster as Kermit
 Michael Patrick McGill as Tommy
 Idara Victor as Sarah
 Sarah Colonna as Lori
 Jess Gabor as Kelly Keefe 
 Dylan Gelula as Megan
 Danube Hermosillo as Pepa
 Rachel Dratch as Paula Bitterman
 Scott Michael Campbell as Brad
 Constance Zimmer as Claudia Nicolo
 Alison Jaye as Julia Nicolo 
 Melissa Paladino as Cami Tamietti 
 Elise Eberle as Sandy Milkovich

Guest
 Andy Buckley as Randy
 Adam Farabee as Byron Koch
 Juliette Angelo as Geneva
 Chester Lockhart as Cole
 Collette Wolfe as Tessa

Episodes

Casting 
In January 2019, Cameron Monaghan, who previously departed the series in season 9, announced that he would be returning for the tenth season. In April 2019, it was announced that Noel Fisher will also return alongside Monaghan for the tenth season, his first time as a series regular since season 5.

Ratings

References

External links
 
 

Shameless (American TV series)
2019 American television seasons
2020 American television seasons